Siuro is a village in the western part of the Nokia town in Pirkanmaa, Finland. In 2015, the population of the village was measured to be 2,526 inhabitants. Siuro is a fairly large area, which includes the western part of the nearby Siuronkoski rapids. The historical border between Turku and Pori and Häme Provinces ran along Siuronkoski until the end of 1972. The village of Linnavuori is also often considered part of Siuro. In the north the area is bordered by Highway 11 and in the south by Lake Kulovesi.

Although Siuro is quite village-like, its largest employers are the factories: the AGCO's power engine plant and Patria's engine maintenance unit in Linnavuori, as well as the Purso's aluminum plant. Siuro also has its own train station, where only freight trains stop today. Less than three kilometers from Siuro station in the direction of Pori, near , there is the Kulovesi stop (abbreviation Kuv), which belonged to the original traffic places of the track. The stop was named after the lake, because on the Riihimäki–Tampere railway line in Lempäälä there was already a traffic place called Kulju. The shutdown mainly served only the needs of Kulju Manor and its surroundings. Passenger traffic was stopped in 1971 and the traffic site was closed in 1972. The buildings on the site have been demolished.

Since 1959, Siuro has been a village bar called Koski-Baari, which is known as a popular place to eat, serving burgers and chicken wings, among other things.

References

External links

 Official Website (in Finnish)
 Nokian kaupunki / Siuro – Nokian kaupunki (in Finnish)

Nokia, Finland
Villages in Finland